Uribe Airport  is an airport serving the town of La Uribe, in the Meta Department of Colombia. The runway and town are on the northern bank of the small Duda River, a tributary of the Guayabero River. High terrain exists north and west.

See also

Transport in Colombia
List of airports in Colombia

References

External links
OpenStreetMap - Uribe
OurAirports - Uribe
FallingRain - Uribe

Airports in Colombia